Acerra is a town in Campania, Italy.

Acerra may also refer to:

People with the surname
 Angelo Thomas Acerra, Roman Catholic bishop

Other uses
 Acerra (incense box), an Ancient Roman sacrificial incense box
 Acerra (moth), a moth genus

See also
 Acera, a town in the Province of Perugia